Court Ladies Preparing Newly Woven Silk is a silk painting attributed to Emperor Huizong of the Song dynasty. It is the only extant copy of a lost original Court Ladies Preparing Newly Woven Wilk by Chinese artist Zhang Xuan. The painting depicts an annual imperial ceremony of silk production, held in spring. It shows three groups of Tang dynasty court ladies at work. Viewing from left, one figure sitting on the ground is preparing a thread and the other are sewing while sitting on a stool. The right group of four ladies are pounding the silk with wooden poles. The group stretching and ironing the silk and the right group which is pounding the silk with wooden poles are depicted in a diamond-shaped formation to produce the feeling of a three-dimensional space.

Originally kept in the Palace Museum in Beijing, the painting was acquired by the Boston Museum of Fine Arts in August 1912.

See also
Silk industry in China

References

External links
Museum entry

Song dynasty paintings
Portraits of women
Silk production
12th-century paintings
Lost paintings